Events in the year 2019 in Cyprus.

Incumbents 
 President: Nicos Anastasiades
 President of the Parliament: Demetris Syllouris

Events
Ongoing – Cyprus dispute

May 
26 May – The 2019 European Parliament election was held to elect the country's six representatives to the European Parliament.

June 
14 June – European Union Mediterranean state leaders offer full support to the country in its dispute with Turkey over offshore natural gas deposit ownership. French President Emmanuel Macron, speaking for the EU, urges Turkey to stop "illegal activities" in the country's exclusive economic zone.

Deaths

March 
10 March – İrsen Küçük, politician and former Prime Minister of Northern Cyprus (b. 1940).
15 March – Mike Thalassitis, footballer and reality show personality (b. 1993).

May 
15 May – Michael Zampelas, politician (b. 1937).
30 May – Leon Redbone, Cypriot-American singer-songwriter and actor (b. 1949).

June 
21 June – Demetris Christofias, politician and former President (b. 1946).

July 
15 July – Alexis Galanos, politician (b. 1940).

References

External links 

 
2010s in Cyprus
Years of the 21st century in Cyprus
Cyprus
Cyprus
Cyprus